Reliant (YT‑803) is a United States Navy .

Construction and commissioning

The contract for Reliant was awarded 10 September 2007. She was laid down by J.M. Martinac Shipbuilding Corp., Tacoma, Washington and launched 10 July 2010. Reliant was delivered to the Navy 28 September 2010.

Operational history

Reliant is assigned to the Navy Region Northwest.

References

 
 

 

Valiant-class tugboats
Ships built in Tacoma, Washington
2009 ships